806 Gyldénia, provisional designation , is a carbonaceous asteroid from the outer region of the asteroid belt, approximately 63 kilometers in diameter. It was discovered on 18 April 1915, by German astronomer Max Wolf at Heidelberg Observatory in southern Germany. The discovery observation was ignored for orbital determination, with the first used observation made at Vienna Observatory on 1 May 2015, reducing the asteroid's observation arc by 2 weeks.

The dark C-type asteroid orbits the Sun at a distance of 3.0–3.5 AU once every 5 years and 9 months (2,100 days). Its orbit has an eccentricity of 0.08 and an inclination of 14° with respect to the ecliptic. Several photometric light-curve analysis rendered a rotation period of  hours (best result) with a brightness variation of 0.18 in magnitude.

According to the surveys carried out by the Infrared Astronomical Satellite, IRAS, the Japanese Akari satellite, and NASA's Wide-field Infrared Survey Explorer with its subsequent NEOWISE mission, the asteroid's surface has a notably low albedo of less than 0.03, while the Collaborative Asteroid Lightcurve Link derived a somewhat higher value of 0.04.
 
The minor planet was named in honor of the Fenno-Swedish astronomer Hugo Gyldén (1841–1896), who was a director of the Stockholm Observatory. He developed a new technique to calculate the perturbations of planets and comets. The lunar crater Gyldén is also named after the astronomer

References

External links 
 Asteroid Lightcurve Database (LCDB), query form (info )
 Dictionary of Minor Planet Names, Google books
 Asteroids and comets rotation curves, CdR – Observatoire de Genève, Raoul Behrend
 Discovery Circumstances: Numbered Minor Planets (1)-(5000) – Minor Planet Center
 
 

000806
Discoveries by Max Wolf
Named minor planets
19150418